Bahnamir (also Romanized as Bahnemīr and Beh Namīr) is a city and capital of Bahnemir District, on the Caspian Sea, in Mazandaran Province of northern Iran.

At the 2006 census, its population was 6,836, in 1,813 families.

References

External links 

 

Cities in Mazandaran Province
Populated places in Babolsar County
Populated places on the Caspian Sea
Populated coastal places in Iran